The Plymouth and Middleborough Railroad was a railroad line between the towns of Middleborough and Plymouth, Massachusetts. It was in service from 1882 to 1939.

History
Incorporated in 1890, the  line opened on November 30, 1892. The next day, it was leased to the Old Colony Railroad for 99 years. In 1893, it became part of the New York, New Haven and Hartford Railroad as part of the lease of the entire Old Colony Railroad network.

Passenger service, never more than a few trips per day, was often operated as –Plymouth or –Plymouth trains. After a competing bus line opened in 1925, passenger service ended in 1927. Beginning in early 1928, freight service was suspended for the winter after the end of the October–December cranberry season.

Freight service between North Carver and Plymouth was discontinued in 1934, and that section of the line was abandoned in 1937. The remainder of the line was abandoned in early 1939 with no objections from shippers.

Stations

References

External links

 Plymouth & Middleboro Railroad October 3, 2009, Retrieved May 16, 2020. Detailed history of the railroad with photos and sources.

Defunct Massachusetts railroads
Old Colony Railroad lines
Plymouth County, Massachusetts